Anthony Francis Lloyd (born 14 March 1984) is an English footballer who plays for North Ferriby United as a defender. He played over 60 games in the Football League for Huddersfield Town and Torquay United as well over 40 games for York City in the Conference Premier.

Career
Born in Taunton, Somerset, Lloyd began his career as a trainee with the Huddersfield Town youth system, signing a professional contract on 22 August 2003. Lloyd made his league debut on 27 September 2003 after starting in a 3–0 win at home to Leyton Orient. He was a member of the 2004 promotion side, playing in the play-off Final at the Millennium Stadium, Cardiff as Huddersfield beat Mansfield Town in a penalty shoot-out after a 0–0 draw after extra time. He finished the 2003–04 season, his first in the first team, with 36 appearances and three goals.

Lloyd joined Torquay United on a one-month loan on 2 November 2005, and this was extended for a second month later in November. He signed for Torquay permanently on 5 January 2006 on a contract until the end of the 2005–06 season. He played against Birmingham City during with Torquay.

He joined Conference National club York City on 20 July 2006, after turning down a new contract with Torquay. He played in both legs of York's 2–1 defeat on aggregate Morecambe in the play-off semi-finals. He finished the 2006–07 season after making 35 appearances for York and the club announced on 16 May 2007 that he would be released when his contract expired on 30 June.

Following his release by York, Lloyd went on trial with Farsley Celtic and signed for the newly promoted Conference Premier side on 31 July. He was employed by the club on a short-term, part-time basis and worked in a warehouse. He rejoined York on 27 September after leaving Farsley. He scored his first goal for York in the FA Trophy first round away to Altrincham, in a 3–1 victory. He was released by York for a second time following the end of the 2007–08 season.

Lloyd joined Guiseley in July 2008. He joined Bradford Park Avenue on loan on 29 December 2010. After being released by Guiseley he signed for Northern Premier League Premier Division side Stocksbridge Park Steels on 28 July 2011. He signed for Northern Premier League Premier Division rivals North Ferriby United in December.

Career statistics

Honours
Huddersfield Town
Football League Third Division play-offs: 2003–04

Footnotes

A.  The "League" column constitutes appearances and goals (including those as a substitute) in the Football League and Football Conference.
B.  The "Other" column constitutes appearances and goals (including those as a substitute) in the Conference League Cup, FA Trophy, Football League Trophy and play-offs.

References

External links

Anthony Lloyd profile at North Ferriby United A.F.C.

1984 births
Living people
Sportspeople from Taunton
English footballers
Association football defenders
Huddersfield Town A.F.C. players
Torquay United F.C. players
York City F.C. players
Farsley Celtic A.F.C. players
Guiseley A.F.C. players
Bradford (Park Avenue) A.F.C. players
Stocksbridge Park Steels F.C. players
North Ferriby United A.F.C. players
English Football League players
National League (English football) players
Northern Premier League players